Jamalabad (also Romanized as Jamālābād and Jemālābād) is a village in Alan Baraghush Rural District, Mehraban District, Sarab County, East Azerbaijan Province, Iran. At the 2006 census, its population was 411, in 115 families.

References 

Populated places in Sarab County